The first four steam locomotives designated as Class B IX by the Royal Bavarian State Railways were procured from the locomotive works of Strousberg. They were transferred in 1872 to the Imperial Railways in Alsace-Lorraine. For the remainder, see Bavarian B IX.

They were equipped with tenders of Class 3 T 10.

See also 
Royal Bavarian State Railways
List of Bavarian locomotives and railbuses
Bavarian B IX

References

 This article is based on a translation of the equivalent page on the German language Wikipedia.

0-4-2 locomotives
B 09 old
Standard gauge locomotives of Germany
Railway locomotives introduced in 1870
B1 n2 locomotives
Hanomag locomotives

Passenger locomotives